Sharp (stylized as S#arp) was a South Korean co-ed pop vocal group that was active from 1998 to 2002.

The group initially consisted of Lee Ji-hye, Seo Ji-young, Jang Seok-hyun, John Kim and Oh Hee-jong. John and Hee-jong left the group after the release of the group's first album, The S#arp, in 1998. New members Sori and Chris joined the group in 1999 for the second album, The S#arp+2. Sori later left the group, and Sharp went on to release the albums, The Four Letter World Love (2000), 4ever Feel So Good (2001), Flat Album (2001), and Style (2002). The group disbanded in 2002, reportedly as a result of ongoing conflict between Ji-hye and Ji-young, including verbal and physical assault.

Sharp was one of the few mixed-gender groups active during an era when single-gender groups such as S.E.S., Fin.K.L, Shinhwa and g.o.d were dominating the music scene. The group won #1 on the music programs Inkigayo and Music Bank, tasting their first success in 1999 with "Tell Me Tell Me."

Members

Final lineup 
 Jang Seok-hyun – leader (1999–2002), rapper (1998–2002)
 Lee Ji-hye – vocalist (1998–2002)
 Seo Ji-young – rapper, vocalist (1998–2002)
 Chris – rapper (1999–2002)

Other past members 
 John Kim – leader, rapper (1998–1999)
 Oh Hee-jong – rapper (1998–1999)
 Sori – rapper (1999–2000)

Discography

Studio albums

Compilation albums

Awards

Mnet Asian Music Awards

References

K-pop music groups
South Korean pop music groups
South Korean idol groups
South Korean dance music groups
Musical groups established in 1998
Musical groups disestablished in 2002
MAMA Award winners
South Korean co-ed groups